Central Otago District is local government district in New Zealand. It is administered by the Central Otago District Council and it is in the Otago region, the top tier of local government in New Zealand. The major towns in the district are Alexandra (the seat of local government), Cromwell, Roxburgh, Clyde and Ranfurly.

The Central Otago District is part of what is informally known as Central Otago. It was formed in 1989 from the merger of the former Vincent and Maniototo Counties. The current mayor is Tim Cadogan, who comfortably unseated the incumbent, Tony Lepper in the 2016 local elections. Mr Cadogan polled 5047 votes, more than double that polled by Mr Lepper, with 2521 votes. Cadogan was reelected with an increased majority in 2019.

Demographics

Central Otago District had a population of 21,558 at the 2018 New Zealand census, an increase of 3,663 people (20.5%) since the 2013 census, and an increase of 4,914 people (29.5%) since the 2006 census. There were 8,682 households. There were 10,977 males and 10,581 females, giving a sex ratio of 1.04 males per female. The median age was 46.5 years (compared with 37.4 years nationally), with 3,651 people (16.9%) aged under 15 years, 2,997 (13.9%) aged 15 to 29, 10,005 (46.4%) aged 30 to 64, and 4,908 (22.8%) aged 65 or older.

Ethnicities were 91.9% European/Pākehā, 8.4% Māori, 2.3% Pacific peoples, 2.7% Asian, and 1.9% other ethnicities. People may identify with more than one ethnicity.

The percentage of people born overseas was 14.6, compared with 27.1% nationally.

Although some people objected to giving their religion, 53.5% had no religion, 37.7% were Christian, 0.3% were Hindu, 0.1% were Muslim, 0.3% were Buddhist and 1.5% had other religions.

Of those at least 15 years old, 2,832 (15.8%) people had a bachelor or higher degree, and 3,654 (20.4%) people had no formal qualifications. The median income was $33,300, compared with $31,800 nationally. 2,667 people (14.9%) earned over $70,000 compared to 17.2% nationally. The employment status of those at least 15 was that 9,615 (53.7%) people were employed full-time, 2,991 (16.7%) were part-time, and 276 (1.5%) were unemployed.

Urban areas 
The Central Otago district has three towns with a population over 1,000: Cromwell, Alexandra, and Clyde. Together they are home to % of the district's population.

See also
Territorial authorities of New Zealand

References

External links

Central Otago District Council